The Octagon House in Watertown, Wisconsin, also known as the Octagon House Museum or the John Richards Octagon House, was built in 1854 and was listed on the National Register of Historic Places in 1971. It is one of many octagon houses built in the United States in the mid-19th century. In 1950 architect Rexford Newcomb wrote, "...probably the best-planned octagon house in the country is the John Richards House at Watertown, Wisconsin..."

History

The house was designed and built by John Richards, a pioneer Watertown lawyer and mill owner, with construction completed in 1854. It was still in the Richards family until the death of his grandson, William Thomas, in 1935. The family offered to sell the house to the city (reputedly for $1) but it was sold to the Watertown Historical Society (founded 1933), and opened to the public in 1938. The house is still a museum open to the public.

It has eight square rooms on each floor and triangular rooms in the corners, a total of 32 rooms including the cupola. The porches or verandas running all round the house are constructed in timber. They are part of the original design, but by 1924 they were so rotten as to be dangerous, and Richards' daughter had them taken down. For many years visitors could only imagine the house with its porches by referring to a scale model of the house, which sits in the grass next to the house. The porches were reconstructed in 1978 at a cost of $50,000. By 2006 they were again in a dangerous condition and an anonymous donation enabled them to be restored once more.

Inside the house at the center a hanging spiral staircase connects the floors. Its rail and spindles are of cherry trees from Richards' land. The staircase is built into four chimney flues that protrude above the cupola. Richards also built a passive air conditioning system into the house, with air intakes below the eaves, ducts in the brick walls, and outlets in the major rooms. The roof is funnel-shaped, and fed rainwater into a tank on the third floor, which fed faucets at a few spots in the house. The kitchen was in the basement, with a Dutch oven big enough to hold 24 loaves of bread. A dumbwaiter carried food from the kitchen up to the dining room.

Richards came to Wisconsin in 1836 and operated a grist mill across the Rock River from this house. He was later appointed the first district attorney of Jefferson County, and was elected justice of the peace and an early mayor of Watertown. In 1840 he fetched his wife Eliza Forbes from Massachusetts, reportedly promising to build her the finest house in the best town in Wisconsin Territory.

The house is located within the Richards Hill Residential Historic District.

Gallery

See also
Octagon house: the article features the Watertown octagon house as a case study and includes the Historic American Buildings Survey drawings.
List of octagon houses
First Kindergarten, the first kindergarten in the United States, located on the same grounds as the Octagon House.

References

External links

Dale Travis, Wisconsin Round Barns List

Houses on the National Register of Historic Places in Wisconsin
Historic American Buildings Survey in Wisconsin
Museums in Jefferson County, Wisconsin
Octagon houses in Wisconsin
Historic house museums in Wisconsin
Houses completed in 1854
Houses in Jefferson County, Wisconsin
National Register of Historic Places in Jefferson County, Wisconsin